Camilla Lopes Gomes (born 27 May 1994) is a Brazilian individual and synchronised trampoline gymnast, representing her nation at international competitions. She competed at world championships, including at the 2013, 2014 2015 Trampoline World Championships.

Personal
She lives in Rio de Janeiro, Brazil.

References

External links
 

1994 births
Brazilian female trampolinists
Competitors at the 2018 South American Games
Competitors at the 2022 South American Games
Doping cases in gymnastics
Gymnasts at the 2015 Pan American Games
Gymnasts at the 2019 Pan American Games
Living people
Pan American Games competitors for Brazil
Place of birth missing (living people)
South American Games gold medalists for Brazil
South American Games medalists in gymnastics
21st-century Brazilian women